Arthur Mario Agricola Collier Galletti di Cadilhac or Arthur Galletti (25 March 1877 – 23 February 1967) was a British Indian civil servant of Italian origin who worked in the Madras Presidency. He translated several works from Telugu to English and also compiled a dictionary of Telugu.

Career
Galletti was the son of Count Arturo Antonio and Margaret Isabella Collier. He was educated at Trinity College, Oxford. While there, he was nicknamed "Gordouli" (after "Gordoulis", a popular brand of Egyptian cigarette) by undergraduates at Balliol, Trinity's neighbouring college, and as such was commemorated in the chant or song (known as a "Gordouli") which began to be sung in a spirit of intercollegiate rivalry over the dividing wall:

Galletti joined the Indian Civil Service in 1900 working in the Godavari District as a collector and later as a magistrate and became an undersecretary to the Revenue Department in 1905. He served as a French translator to the government from 1909. In 1918 a refusal to drink to the health of King George V at a party held in Horsleykonda on 24 May (Empire Day) resulted in his being sidelined and a formal inquiry was held by a committee headed by Sir William Ayling. 

Galletti wrote on the Dutch in Malabar (1911). He retired from the civil service in 1934. As an expert on Telugu, he translated K. Viresalingam's Vinodha Taringini and compiled a dictionary of Telugu in 1935. He also wrote numerous government reports.

Personal life
Galletti married Clara Salvadori-Paleotti in 1906. They had a daughter and a son.

His brother, Roberto Clemens Galletti di Cadilhac, was a pioneer of the radio transmission.

References

External links 
 Galletti's Telugu Dictionary (1935)
 The Dutch in Malabar (1911)

Indian Civil Service (British India) officers
1877 births
1967 deaths
Telugu writers
Alumni of Trinity College, Oxford
British people in colonial India